Stephen Eyton or Edon (fl. 1320?), was an English chronicler.

Eyton was a canon of the Augustinian priory of Warter, near Pocklington in the East Riding of Yorkshire. His name may derive from the nearby village of Etton. He wrote a work entitled Acta Edwardi II ("The Acts of Edward II"), whose opening words were Post mortem toti mundo deflendam ("After the death of the whole world, bewail"). John Leland found a copy in the library of Fountains Abbey, but it has not since been identified.

References

Year of birth missing
Year of death missing
14th-century deaths
People from Pocklington
14th-century English people
14th-century English writers
English chroniclers
Augustinian canons
Clergy from Yorkshire